{{Infobox film
| name           = Christopher
| image          = Christopher.jpeg
| caption        = Theatrical release poster
| director       = B. Unnikrishnan
| producer       = B. Unnikrishnan
| writer         = Udaykrishna
| story          = 
| starring       = 
| music          = Justin Varghese
| editing        = Manoj
| cinematography = Faiz Siddik
| studio         = RD Illuminations
| distributor    = 
| released       = 
| country        = India
| language       = Malayalam
| runtime        = 150 minutes
| budget         = 
| gross          = 10.17 crore<ref>
Christopher is a 2023 Indian Malayalam-language vigilante action thriller film directed by B. Unnikrishnan and written by Udaykrishna starring Mammootty in the titular role, with an ensemble cast of Vinay Rai, R. Sarathkumar, Sneha, Amala Paul, Aishwarya Lakshmi, Aditi Ravi, Shine Tom Chacko, Deepak Parambol and Siddique. The cinematography is handled by Faiz Siddik and the music is composed by Justin Varghese.

Principal photography began on 10 July 2022 and finished on 29 September 2022.

Christopher was released in theatres on 9 February 2023 and received mixed to positive reviews from critics.

Plot 
ADGP Christopher Antony is an honest and efficient IPS officer and encounter specialist from the Kerala cadre who uses vigilantism and encounter killings as a tool for safeguarding women,children and other innocent and helpless people. He kills 5 people in an encounter for brutally assaulting and murdering a woman. Under pressure from the Human rights activists, CM Rajashekaran Menon is pressured by the Home Secretary and Christopher's ex-wife, Beena Mariam Chacko, to launch an investigation into the deaths of 5 youngsters. ACP Sulekha is appointed to lead the investigation, where she decides to unearth Christopher's previous encounter killings instead of probing by looking into the case files. 

Sulekha learns that Christopher's motive to become an IPS officer and encounter specialist is due to some gruesome incidents during his childhood. Years ago, during a riot in Kerala, a group of young men used the situation to brutally rape and murder Christopher's sister. They also killed his parents and set his house on fire. A young Christopher seeked to avenge his loved ones and chased the perpetrators with a butcher's knife. However, Christopher was stopped by a kind and upright police officer, SP Vetrivel IPS. When Vetrivel learnt about the injustice that happened to Christopher's family, he shot the perpetrators to death. This incident inspired Christopher to become a police officer. It was Vetrivel who took care of the rest of Christopher's education, and later he cleared the civil service exam to become an IPS officer. After Christopher completed his police training, Vetrivel who was on deputation as the DGP in the Central Government, intervened to get Christopher his first posting as ASP in Madhya Pradesh. Everyday many women were raped and murdered by the feudal landlords. Christopher was very instrumental in capturing and killing the real perpetrators behind the brutal happenings and in no time, he became an encounter specialist. He was assisted by an honest and efficient cop, Sub Inspector Ismail who was his right hand man. Later, Christopher shifted his base to Kerala and was promoted to the rank of Superintendent of Police . 

Later one day, he met Beena who was the Pondicherry District Collector regarding a series of robberies and murders which constantly took place in a densely forested area. Christopher and his team decided to take up the mission. The operation was completed successfully, but Ismail had succumbed to his injuries. At Ismail's funeral, Christopher came to know more about Ismail's family. Ismail's marriage was a love marriage and his wife had already passed away and that he had a daughter named Amina. Ismail's relatives were dead against accepting Amina. So Christopher took Amina as his own child and decided to look after her. Christopher was then posted as the SP of Crime Branch. After some days, Beena also shifted her base to Kerala. Later upon Beena's insistence and request, Christopher married Beena and they lived happily and peacefully. Later one day, at a hotel in Kochi, a group of girls were found heavily doped by a gang of young men. From the investigation, it was found out that the real culprit was Beena's younger brother, Sebastian who was a drug addict. Beena and her father Chackochan who was an MP along with Abhilash, settled the issue by paying a huge sum of money to each of the girls. Then one day, a lady who was working as a maid at Beena's father's home told Christopher that her daughter had been missing for a few days. Christopher decided to investigate and found out that Sebastian had brutally raped and murdered the girl under the influence of drugs and destroyed her body using a crusher and had also hidden the remaining body parts and hair in some statues in his father's ceramic factory. Sebastian was arrested by Christopher but Chackochan told Christopher that he will surely bail out Sebastian. The next day, at the court, Sebastian tried to escape from the clutches of the police by behaving very violently and snatched a rifle from a policeman to try and kill the victim's mother by hitting her on the head, but she was saved by Christopher who shot Sebastian to death. After this incident, Christopher and Beena were separated and later parted ways. With that, he had lost everything, but the only person who he had with him was his adopted daughter Amina. Later after a few months, Christopher rejoined service, but was made to stay away from law and order. He was posted in the DPCAW. After some years, he got promoted to the rank of ADGP.

Now in the present, Christopher's adopted daughter, Amina who is now an investigative lawyer and social activist, investigates the death of a woman and her father, who are actually the wife and father-in-law of a rich businessman, Sitaram Trimurthi Iyer. From the investigation, Amina deduces that Sitaram had actually killed his wife and father-in-law in order to usurp their properties. She shares her suspicions and doubts to Christopher. Later one day, Amina is found dead and brutally assaulted. With Amina's death, Christopher is completely shattered. Sulekha decides to take up the investigation of Amina's murder. A somewhat corrupt and psychopathic cop named DYSP George Kottrakkan is also included in the team. Christopher soon finds out that Sitaram had hired a dangerous criminal named Marimuthu to eliminate Amina. Christopher manages to track down Marimuthu in Tamil Nadu where Sulekha and team arrive to provide backup for Christopher. Sulekha hands over Marimuthu to George. But George who took bribes from Sitaram and also from his assistant Pathalam Suresh lets Marimuthu escape into the forest, where he is again successfully nabbed by Christopher. Christopher and his assistant, SP Vadivukkarasi calls Sulekha to a secret location where Christopher makes Marimuthu confess his crimes completely. Christopher also reveals Kottrakkan's corruptness and also his ties with Sitharam and also the cruelty shown by him towards Amina's friend, Susan. Christopher finally reveals the truth about the failure about the present legal system and policing system to Sulekha and also tells her that even if she arrests Marimuthu, he will definitely be freed by the judiciary. Sulekha later understands Christopher and decides to support him and stand by him completely and Marimuthu is hanged to death by Christopher in that hideout itself.

Later Christopher tracks down George and Suresh where he makes George to speak the truth. After George reveals Sitaram's name, Christopher shoots him to death and arranges Suresh to finish off Sitaram  as Suresh had been fooled by Sitaram earlier. However, Sitaram manages to overpower Suresh and kill him. At that very instant, he was confronted by a police team headed by north zone ADGP Gaurishankar IPS who is Christopher's batchmate and close friend. Thus, Sitaram is arrested and sent to prison. Despite being in prison, Sitaram kills Beena using carbon monoxide poisoning by releasing the gas through the air conditioner in her room. This devastates Christopher, who is more determined than ever to kill Sitaram, once and for all. 

Christopher is completely cleared of all charges and joins back his duty and is posted as the ADGP, Headquarters. He shoots Sitaram to death with the help of the jail superintendent, who is Amina's distant relative. Sitaram's death is written as an act of self-defence and the jail superintendent promises Christopher that he will look after all the further proceedings. A few weeks later, Christopher adopts the younger sister of the assaulted woman and moves on.

Cast

Production 
Principal photography began on 10 July 2022 with a pooja function. On 18 July 2022, Mammootty joined the sets of the film. The film is shot in many places across Kerala including Ernakulam, Pooyamkutty and Vandiperiyar. Vinay Rai was cast in to play the antagonist in the film, marking his debut in Malayalam cinema. Filming took 79 days and was completed on 29 September 2022. Mammootty had finished shooting his portions, in a span of 65 days, a week before filming ended. In post-production stage, the film was sent to the Central Board of Film Certification and was censored with a U/A certificate on 31 January 2023.

Release 
Christopher was released in theatres on 9 February 2023.

Reception 
S.R. Praveen for The Hindu reviewing the film wrote "For Mammootty, who has been having a good run in recent months, it is back to the same old. Amala Paul and Sneha get lengthier roles, while Aishwarya Lekshmi’s is rather insignificant. Shine Tom Chacko repeats his infamous interview persona on screen for the second film running.Christopher is one long, unfortunate celebration of encounter killings." 

Anna M. M. Vetticad reviewed the film for the Firstpost and rated 0.5 star out of 5 stars and wrote "One of the nice developments of the past year has been that Mammootty is camouflaging his age a little less than he earlier was. In this film he even has a touch of white in his hair and moustache. There is of course a double standard in increasingly acknowledging your advancing years yet denying space to your female contemporaries to star as your lover and sibling in films." 

Anandu Suresh of The Indian Express and rated the movie 2 stars out of 5 and wrote "Even with its running time of close to two-and-a-half hours, the film’s climax got over in the blink of an eye, leaving the viewers wondering what just happened."

Latha Srinivasan of India Today rated the movie 2.5 stars out of 5 and wrote "The story just unfolds itself pretty much in the first half an hour and becomes very predictable. There is no hook to engage the audience nor any twist and turn that leaves us surprised. The villain also doesn’t offer anything to the viewer and is quite cliched."

The Times of India wrote "In trying to build up Christopher, every other character was ignored. Also, absolutely no one wants to see a series of gory rape scenes spread throughout the movie. Viewers can understand the gravity of the crime and injustice without forcing it and could even be triggering for viewers who have faced assault in the past."

Princy Alexander of Onmanorama wrote "Unnikrishnan and Udayakrishna's previous work 'Aarattu', which featured Mohanlal in the lead, had not really gone down well with the audience, but this time, they have managed to pull off a pretty decent entertainer."

References

External links 
 

2023 films
2023 action thriller films
Indian action thriller films
2020s Malayalam-language films
Films directed by B. Unnikrishnan
Films scored by Justin Varghese
Indian vigilante films
Indian police films
Fictional portrayals of the Kerala Police
Films shot in Idukki
Films shot in Kochi